Challenger, Gray & Christmas is headquartered in Chicago, Illinois, and is the first executive outplacement firm in the US. It has offices throughout North America. James E. Challenger is the founder of the company. The Society for Human Resource Management recognized him in 1996 as the creator and pioneer of the outplacement field.
James E. Challenger, the company's founder, spent years trying to persuade companies that it was good business to be nice to people heading involuntarily out the door.

In 2003, John A. Challenger gave testimony before the U.S. House Committee on Small Business on the issue of permanent job loss in a global economy.  In 2002, at the height of the turmoil over corporate governance, The Wall Street Journal invited Challenger to address the issue in a bylined article that appeared in The Journal on June 25, 2002.  He served on the labor/human resource committee of The Federal Reserve Bank of for two three-year terms.

Early years 
Outplacement services, provided by scores of firms, have become standard at most large companies, but in 1977 it was estimated that only 40% of major American companies offered outplacement. As early as 1977, Challenger, Gray & Christmas was recognized among the oldest and largest outplacement firms. The earliest major customers of Challenger, Gray & Christmas included Motorola Inc., McDonald's, United Airlines, Quaker Oats Company and Sears Roebuck & Company.

In 1961, James Challenger was dismissed from his law firm position for taking time off. In 1966, his desire to help led him to found Challenger, Gray & Christmas, Inc., the first outplacement firm in the country.

He devised a training, counseling, and support program to help job seekers find new jobs quickly and successfully. He told UPI’s Cathy Lewandowski in 1983: “There is no such thing as total job security today. Any individual, no matter what position, should be ready to prepare a clearly defined alternative plan which can be implemented in case of termination.''

Publications 
"Outplacement" by James Challenger, 1994.

"The Challenger Guide: Job-Hunting Success for Mid-Career Professionals" by James Challenger, 2000.

Events and initiatives 
Since 1985, Challenger has held a 2-day annual Career Help Hotline, also called Call-In Days.

 Coaches give advice on:
 Military to civilian job searches
 The job search for new college grads
 Retirement
 The job search for those over age 55
 Explaining a career gap
 Resume writing
 Interviewing
 Career advancement
 Transferring skills
 Switching industries
 Turning a temporary position into a permanent one
 Finding a job after incarceration

The hotline does not place callers with new employers, nor can its coaches review individual resumes or point callers to specific opportunities.

Company goals

The company's primary goal is to make the transition to reemployment easier for displaced workers The company specializes in sponsoring business benefits and services in the following areas: 1) Communication Strategy & Timing, 2) Phase Out/Shut Down 3) Community Awareness 4) Employee Retention 5) Contingency Planning, 6) Security and 7) Public Agency Involvement.

Challenger Job Cuts Report

The media has covered the company extensively since the late-1970s. As the concept of lifetime employment started to come to an end in the 1980s and ‘90s, founder James Challenger was a critical voice in the national press on the responsibility of companies to help their former workers after a layoff. In 1993, Challenger founded the Challenger Layoff Report which publishes the number of job cuts announced by companies month-by-month.

Exclusive research

Challenger's research on job cut announcements by US-based employers has been referenced all over the world and is used by leading economists on the labor market. It is regarded as an economic indicator 

The firm also conducts research on chief executive officer turnover 

The firm conducts regular surveys and issues reports on the state of the economy, employment, job-seeking, layoffs and executive compensation. It conducts one-off surveys on such subjects as workplace bullying, lost productivity due to the Super Bowl, working women and the impact of MeToo on the workplace 

The firm was cited by Fortune magazine in 2018 for its study on office romance in the age of Metoo.

Other research includes the cost of the 2007 "March Madness" on the productivity of US businesses, the flat rate of hiring seasonal workers in 2011, declining rate of teen employment in 2012, rising planned layoffs at the U.S. companies in 2013
One of the key developments of this firm is the awarding of a $5 million federal contract from the US Navy's Chief of Naval Installations Milling, Tennessee, for professional, scientific and technical services.

References

External links
Official Website

Employment agencies of the United States
Market research companies of the United States
Public opinion research companies in the United States
Executive search firms
Companies based in Chicago
American companies established in 1966
1966 establishments in Illinois